Harmonic Tremors is the first studio album by post-metal band Zozobra. It was released in 2007 on Hydra Head Records.

Track listing
 The Blessing – 5:36
 Kill and Crush – 3:26
 Levitate – 3:00
 Soon to Follow – 4:14
 Silver Ghost – 3:19
 Invisible Wolves – 2:54
 Peripheral Lows – 2:18
 The Vast Expanse – 4:23
 Caldera – 4:08
 A Distant Star Fades – 4:02

Personnel 
 Caleb Scofield – Bass guitar, guitar, vocals, producer
 Santos "Hanno" Montano – Drums
 Adam McGrath – Guitar, back vocal, soloist
 Aaron Turner – Artwork and design
 Andrew Schneider – Producer, Engineer, Mixing
 Nick Zampiello – Mastering

External links
Aaron Turner explains the cover art a little further

Zozobra (band) albums
2007 albums
Hydra Head Records albums
Albums with cover art by Aaron Turner